is a definition of metropolitan areas used in Japan, defined by the Center for Spatial Information Service of the University of Tokyo. Japan's Ministry of Economy, Trade and Industry defined 233 areas for the UEAs of Japan. It is different from the definition of metropolitan areas defined in census by the Ministry of Internal Affairs and Communications. For the latter scheme, see the List of metropolitan areas in Japan article.

The basic principle of UEA is similar to that of the Statistics Bureau definition; a central city and its associated outlying municipalities with certain numbers of commuters. A UEA with at least 50,000 DID (Densely Inhabited District) population is called  or MEA for short in English. A UEA with at least 10,000 and less than 50,000 DID population is called  or McEA for short in English.

Definition
Central city
If a municipality has at least 10,000 DID population, and is not a suburb of any other municipalities, it is defined as a central city.
Even if a municipality is a suburb of another, it can still be defined as a central city. In this case, a municipality must have workers working there more than those living there. It must also have the DID  population of at least 10,000, or a third of the population of the central city.
Suburb
If a municipality A has more than 10% of its population commuting to a central city B, A is defined as a (primary) suburb of B.
If there are multiple such cities for a suburb A, the one with the most commuters from A is defined as A's central city.
If a municipality A has more than 10% of its population commuting to another suburb B, and if no other municipalities have more commuters from A, A is defined as a secondary suburb or lower of B.
If a municipality A has more than 10% of its population commuting to B and vice versa, the one with the higher percentage of commuters is defined as a suburb of another.
If a central city comprises multiple municipalities, numbers of commuters to all those municipalities are counted for the calculations above.

Top 100 Urban Employment Areas in Japan

Source: Urban Employment Area (UEA) Code Table, 
W/L here is jūgyō jōjū jinkōhi (従業常住人口比), the ratio of workers in the area, against the number of workers living in the area.
DID population here is a population of central city. If an area has multiple central cities, only the most populous one among them is counted.
A 2015 population decrease from 2005 is written in  figures.
Metropolitan Employment Area (MEA) is listed on white background. Micropolitan Employment Area (McEA) is listed on  background.
Prefectural capital is numbered with  background.
1980 ranks include Kurashiki MEA, which was merged with Okayama MEA in 2000. Those under No. 100 are marked as "-".

These areas have multiple central cities. Municipal names are as of 2015.
Tokyo: 8; Special wards of Tokyo, Saitama, Chiba, Tachikawa, Musashino, Yokohama, Kawasaki, and Atsugi.
Osaka: 4; Osaka, Sakai, Moriguchi, Kadoma, and Higashiosaka.
Nagoya: 6; Nagoya, Komaki, Tokai, Handa, Kariya, and Anjō.
Kyoto: 2; Kyoto and Kusatsu.
Sapporo: 2; Sapporo and Otaru.
Maebashi: 2; Maebashi and Takasaki
Naha: 2; Naha and Urasoe.
Tsukuba: 2; Tsukuba and Tsuchiura.
Ota: 2; Ota and Oizumi.
Kamisu: 2; Kamisu and Kashima.
Nasushiobara: 2; Nasushiobara and Otawara.
Sanjō: 2; Sanjō and Tsubame.

These areas changed their names between 1980 and 2000, as the most populated central cities have changed.
Tsuchiura MEA changed to Tsukuba MEA after 1995.
Kimitsu MEA changed to Kisarazu MEA after 1990.

See also
List of metropolitan areas in Japan by population
List of Japanese cities by population
Daily urban system

References

External links
UEA Urban Employment Area

Metropolitan areas of Japan